Thollon's red colobus (Piliocolobus tholloni), also known as the Tshuapa red colobus, is a species of red colobus monkey from the Democratic Republic of the Congo and lower Republic of the Congo. It is found south of Congo River and west of Lomami River. It had once been considered a subspecies of the P. badius. It was recognised as a distinct species by Dandelot in 1974, and this was followed by Groves in 2001, while others have suggested it should be considered a subspecies of P. rufomitratus.

References

External links 
 Flickr - image of the Thollon's red colobus (Procolobus tholloni)
 Flickr - image of the Thollon's red colobus (Procolobus tholloni)
 Flickr - image of the Thollon's red colobus (Procolobus tholloni)
 Flickr - image of the Thollon's red colobus (Procolobus tholloni)

Thollon's red colobus
Mammals of the Republic of the Congo
Mammals of the Democratic Republic of the Congo
Fauna of Central Africa
Endangered fauna of Africa
Thollon's red colobus
Primates of Africa
Endemic fauna of the Democratic Republic of the Congo